Industrial City is a former community in Buchanan County, Missouri.  It is now part of St. Joseph.  It once had its own post office that has now closed.

Former populated places in Buchanan County, Missouri
St. Joseph, Missouri
Former populated places in Missouri